Gaius Servilius Ahala was a three time consular tribune, in 408, 407 and 402 and one-time magister equitum, in 408 BC, of the Roman Republic.

Servilius belonged to the Servilia gens, and old and prominent patrician gens of the early Republic which rose to prominence in the middle of the 5th century BC. Filiations give us that Servilius father was named Publius and grandfather was named Quintus. Servilius father can be assumed to be the otherwise unattested Publius Servilius Ahala. Servilius grandfather could either be an otherwise unattested Quintus Servilius Ahala, the dictator in 435 Quintus Servilius Priscus, or Quintus Servilius Priscus the consul in 468 BC. It is unclear if Servilius had any children of his own, but Gaius Servilius Ahala, magister equitum in 389 BC, is a possible son and Spurius Servilius Structus, consular tribune in 368 BC, is a possible grandson.

Career 
Servilius first held the imperium in 408 BC as one of the three elected consular tribunes for that year. His colleague in the office was Gaius Julius Iulus and Publius Cornelius Cossus. The year saw war with the Aequi and Volscians. Servilius, deeming his colleagues as incapable of handling the situation circumvented them by appointing a dictator, Publius Cornelius Rutilus Cossus. The newly appointed dictator, overtaking the imperium from the consulars, appointed Servilius as his second (magister equitum) and successfully campaigned against both the Aequi and Volsci.

Servilius gamble by going against his consular colleagues seems to have resulted in few if any visible repercussions as he was again elected as consular tribune the following year, in 407 BC. This new college consisted of four members with his new colleagues being Lucius Furius Medullinus, Gaius Valerius Potitus Volusus and Numerius Fabius Vibulanus. This new and very experienced college (all had held the imperium on several occasions previously) could not repeat the success of the previous year and were defeated by the Volsci resulting in the loss of Verrugo.

The following year Servilius would again serve the Republic in its military endeavours against the Volsci. Servilius served under the consular tribune Numerius Fabius Ambustus at Anxur, most likely as a legatus.

A few years later, in 402 BC, Servilius would be elected for a third and final term as consular tribune. He shared the office with five others, Quintus Servilius Fidenas (a distant relative), Lucius Verginius Triocostus Esquilinus, Quintus Sulpicius Camerinus Cornutus, Aulus Manlius Vulso Capitolinus and Manius Sergius Fidenas. The year would again see strife within the consular college. This internal strife would result in the defeat of Sergius at Veii by a combined force of the Veientanes and Faliscans when his colleague and political rival Verginius refused him aid. Servilius, in similar fashion to his actions during 408 BC, went against his colleagues, with the aid of the senate, and forced the whole college (including himself) to abdicate in favour of a newly elected college of tribunes.

There is some confusion in regards to the identity of the Gaius Servilius Ahala who served as magister equitum in 389 BC under the dictator Marcus Furius Camillus. This co-dictator could possibly be the elder Servilius being appointed for a second time to the role or potentially an otherwise unattested son or relative of his. The classicists Broughton favours the view of them as two different individuals.

Cognomen 
Servilius differs, as several of his contemporaries among the consular tribunes, in regards to his cognomen. Most sources agree on "Ahala" as his main identifying cognomen while a few, for example the Chronograph of 354, uses the cognomen "Structus". Thus Servilius can be named in three different ways: Gaius Servilius Ahala, Gaius Servilius Structus Ahala or Gaius Servilius Structus. The consensus favors either of the options containing "Ahala" with Broughton having him simply named Gaius Servilius Ahala.

See also

References 

5th-century BC Romans
Roman consular tribunes
Ahala, Gaius